Nadine Fiers (born 12 January 1966) is a former Belgian racing cyclist. She finished in second place in the Belgian National Road Race Championships in 1985.

References

External links

1966 births
Living people
Belgian female cyclists
Sportspeople from Ghent
Cyclists from East Flanders